So Hyon-uk (born 17 April 1992) is a North Korean international footballer who plays for North Korea national football team.

Club career
He played with April 25 Sports Club in North Korea before moving abroad in 2017 to play in Bosnia and Herzegovina first with HŠK Zrinjski Mostar and then on loan at NK GOŠK Gabela, both playing in the Premier League of Bosnia and Herzegovina. After one year in Bosnia he left with technical staff of both clubs indicating that despite his great performances, his spell in Bosnia was not more successful because of communication difficulties since he did not speak any English. However, his performances did not pass unnoticed in neighbouring Serbia with a top-league club, FK Zemun, signing him that summer. However, by mid August club and player agreed to mutually release him before he got a chance to debut in the league.

International career
He has played for the North Korean national team since 2014. He was part of the North Korean squad at the 2015 AFC Asian Cup where they reached the final.

International goals
Scores and results list North Korea's goal tally first.

Honours

Club
April 25
DPR Korea League: 2012, 2013, 2015, 2017
Hwaebul Cup: 2013, 2014, 2015, 2016

Zrinjski
Premier League of Bosnia and Herzegovina: 2017–18

National team
North Korea U23
Asian Games: 2014 (runner-up)

References

1992 births
Living people
North Korean footballers
North Korea international footballers
2015 AFC Asian Cup players
Asian Games medalists in football
Footballers at the 2014 Asian Games
April 25 Sports Club players
HŠK Zrinjski Mostar players
NK GOŠK Gabela players
Premier League of Bosnia and Herzegovina players
Expatriate footballers in Bosnia and Herzegovina
FK Zemun players
Expatriate footballers in Serbia
Asian Games silver medalists for North Korea
Association football wingers
Medalists at the 2014 Asian Games
21st-century North Korean people